Vadim Rudenko (born December 8, 1967, in Krasnodar) is a Russian pianist.

While still a student at the Moscow Conservatory, he was a finalist at the XII Queen Elisabeth Competition and the XII Paloma O'Shea Competition in 1992. After graduating he took part in the X International Tchaikovsky Competition in 1994; with first prize being declared void he was awarded the third prize, ex-aequo with Hae-Sun Paik, behind Nikolai Lugansky. Four years later, Rudenko attained the XI edition's second prize.

Rudenko has performed internationally since.

References
 Moscow State Philharmonic Society

1967 births
Living people
Russian classical pianists
Male classical pianists
21st-century classical pianists
21st-century Russian male musicians